Follow the Light is the twelfth studio album by German band Bad Boys Blue. It was released on 27 September 1999 by Coconut Records. There were no singles released for this record. The album is unusually long and features 16 tracks. John McInerney performed all the songs. The album scored #80 in German charts.
 
Tony Hendrik and Karin Hartmann were back writing and producing—along with Andy Matern.

Track listing
"Follow the Light" – 3:34   
"Thinking About You" – 3:25   
"When I Kiss You" – 3:51   
"I Can't Live" – 3:53   
"Under the Boardwalk '99" – 3:16   
"Back to the Future" – 3:53   
"Listen to Your Heart" – 3:39   
"Hungry for Love (Rap Version)'99" – 3:17   
"Sweet Love" – 3:25   
"Baby Blue '99" – 3:46   
"Rhythm of Rain" – 3:59   
"I'll Be Around" – 3:42   
"Ride on a Star" – 3:23   
"Love Is No Crime '99" – 4:03   
"Have You Ever Had a Love Like This '99" – 3:32   
"Back to the Future (Level 1 Remix)" – 4:11

Personnel
Bad Boys Blue
John McInerney – Lead vocal (all tracks) 
Andrew Thomas
Mo Russel

Additional personnel
Rap parts: Jojo Max (8)

Credits
All tracks written by T. Hendrik/K.van Haaren except 1 written by T. Hendrik/Worthy Davis; 2 written by Uwe Haselsteiner/Heiko Schneider; 3, 6, 16 written by Carsten Wegener; 5 written by Young/Resnick; 7, 9 written by Uwe Haselsteiner, Heiko Schneider/Heiko Schneider; 8 written by T. Hendrik/K. van Haaren & Jojo Max; 12 written by Andreas Matern/Worthy Davis & 13 written by T. Hendrik/R. Preuss
Tracks 2, 7, 9 produced by Uwe Haselsteiner and Heiko Schneider at X-Talk Studio, Rüsselsheim
Track 1 programmed and arranged by Tony Hendrik, Andy Matern and Christoph Schick, mixed by Andy Matern at Coconut Studio 2, produced by Hendrik/Hartmann.
Tracks 3, 14, 15 programmed, arranged and mixed by Christoph Schick at Coconut Studio2. Produced by Hendrik/Hartmann, co-produced by Christoph Schick.
Tracks 4, 10, 11, 13 programmed and arranged by Andy Matern and Christoph Schick, mixed by Andy Matern at Coconut Studio 2. Produced by Hendrik/Hartmann, co-produced by Matern/Schick.
Tracks 5, 6, 8 programmed, arranged and mixed by Andy Matern at Coconut Studio 2. Produced by Hendrik/Hartmann, co-produced by Andy Matern.
Tracks 12, 16 produced, programmed, arranged and mixed by Andy Matern at Andy's Studio.
Leadvocals on Tracks 1, 3, 4, 6, 11, 12, 13, 16 recorded at Ton-Studio M. Dorth, Troisdorf.

References

External links
Bad Boys Blue – general information

1999 albums
Bad Boys Blue albums